Desert Palms may refer to:
Desert Palms, California
Desert Palms Park
Desert Palms Elementary